The 2008 WGC-Accenture Match Play Championship was a golf tournament that was played from February 20–24, 2008 over the South Course at The Gallery Golf Club at Dove Mountain in Marana, Arizona. It was the tenth WGC-Accenture Match Play Championship and the first of three World Golf Championships held in 2008.

The purse remained at $8,000,000, one of the largest in golf. Tiger Woods won his third WGC Match Play title, and his 15th World Golf Championships event, by beating fellow American Stewart Cink 8 and 7 in the final.

Brackets
The Championship was a single elimination match play event. The field consisted of the top 64 players available from the Official World Golf Rankings, seeded according to the rankings. Brett Wetterich (ranked 45) pulled out of the event with a shoulder injury and was replaced by J. B. Holmes (ranked 65).

Bobby Jones bracket

Ben Hogan bracket

Gary Player bracket

Sam Snead bracket

Final Four

Championship match

Yellow background for eagles.
Red background for birdies.
Blue background for bogeys.

Breakdown by country

Prize money breakdown

 Sources:

References

External links
Official site
European Tour Weekly - February 19, 2008

2008
2008 WGC-Accenture Match Play Championship
2008 in golf
2008 in American sports
February 2008 events in the United States